David McNicol (1833 – 1927) was a Scottish-born Ontario farmer and political figure. He represented Grey South in the Legislative Assembly of Ontario from 1894 to 1898 as a Patrons of Industry member.

He was born in Lamlash on the Isle of Arran, the son of John McNicol, and was educated there. McNicol served as reeve of Bentinck Township, near Hanover, Ontario from 1876 to 1886 and was warden for Grey County in 1883.

References

External links 
The Canadian parliamentary companion, 1897 JA Gemmill

A History of the county of Grey, EL Marsh (1931)

1833 births
1927 deaths
Ontario Patrons of Industry MPPs
People from Grey County
Scottish emigrants to Canada